This is a list of episodes in the ABC television series Benson.

Series overview 
Broadcast history

Episodes

Season 1 (1979–80)

Season 2 (1980–81)

Season 3 (1981–82)

Season 4 (1982–83)

Season 5 (1983–84)

Season 6 (1984–85)

Season 7 (1985–86)

References

External links 
 
 

Benson